Unlimited Warriors is a Czech 1996 martial arts-themed fighting/action game developed by Digitalica and published by Space Interactive for PC DOS.

References 

1996 video games